Alfred McClelland (18 April 1886 – 29 January 1969) was an Australian politician. He was a Labor Party member of the New South Wales Legislative Assembly from 1920 until 1927, representing Northern Tablelands, and from 1930 to 1932, representing Dubbo. His son and grandson both went on to hold senior roles in federal politics, creating a rare three-generation political dynasty.

Biography 
McClelland was born at Black Creek, near Nundle, and was educated at Nundle Public School. He worked as a shearer and bushworker after leaving school, and was active in local affairs, founding the Nundle League in 1902. He was appointed as an organiser with the Australian Workers' Union in 1914, and was an executive councillor and the vice-president of the union's Western branch from 1916 until his election to parliament at the 1920 election.

McClelland twice attempted to enter state politics before his 1920 victory, losing to Labor-turned-Nationalist MLA George McDonald in Bingara at a 1916 by-election and again in 1917. In 1920, on his third attempt, he was elected as the sole Labor member in the multi-member electorate of Northern Tablelands. He was easily re-elected in 1922 and 1925, but faced a very difficult race in 1927. The multi-member system had been abolished, and McClelland had chosen to contest the newly recreated seat of Armidale, which saw him challenged by prominent Country Party MLA David Drummond; Drummond won the seat in a landslide. He achieved a brief political comeback in 1930, winning newly recreated Dubbo, but lost it to the Country Party's George Wilson in the Labor defeat of 1932. McClelland again contested the seat in 1935, but was defeated, and did not run for public office again.

McClelland became a farmer at Northmead after leaving politics.

His son, Doug McClelland, was a Senator from 1962 to 1987, and was a minister in the Whitlam government. His grandson, Robert McClelland, was federal Attorney-General from 2007 to 2011.

Death 
Alfred McClelland died in Sydney in 1969 , and was cremated at Rookwood Cemetery.

References

 

1886 births
1969 deaths
Members of the New South Wales Legislative Assembly
Australian trade unionists
Australian Labor Party members of the Parliament of New South Wales
20th-century Australian politicians